Abu Saiba is a village located in the northern part of Bahrain, west of the capital city Manama.  It is surrounded by Shakhoora village to the south and Hajar village to the east.

History

Abu Saiba is very well known of its farms, though, most of these farms have vanished as a result of the negligence and the lack of support by the government for local farmers. The visitor to the village may still find some old houses in the village narrow lanes and corridors.

Abu Saiba's Hussainia is a famous religious place in Abu Saiba Village. The construction of this architectural masterpiece was completed in January 2007. It can accommodate two thousand people in its basement and ground levels. This hussania has become a tourist attraction that attracts many foreign visitors.

References

Populated places in the Northern Governorate, Bahrain